Dziemionna  is a village in the administrative district of Gmina Nowa Wieś Wielka, within Bydgoszcz County, Kuyavian-Pomeranian Voivodeship, in north-central Poland.

Dziemionna is located to the south-east of Nowa Wieś Wielka on the eastern edge of the former wetlands called Dziemionna (German: Dzimiona Bruch). From the east to the village adjoins a strip of forest, through which runs the national road No. 25 Bydgoszcz-Inowrocław and the railway line No. 131. The village is adjacent to the east with Nowa Wia Wielka and Tarkow Dolny. The village lies within a large valley depression drained in the west by the Noteć River (Odra basin) and the Green Struga River in the east (the Vistula basin). In the south, on the moraine Wysoczyzna Kujawska (erected about 10 m higher), the village of Krążkowo is adjacent. Physically and geographically, it lies within the Toruń-Eberswald Pradolina in the mesoregion of the Toruń Basin.

There are two closed evangelical cemeteries in the village.

The history of settlement of the Dziemionna village dates back to the 19th century and is associated with the German settlement characteristic for this area. The village was not marked on the topographical map of Friedrich von Schrötter (1798-1802), which documents the state at the time of the passage of the area under the tutelage of the Kingdom of Prussia. In the second half of the nineteenth century, the village was called Minutsdorf. In January 1920, under the Treaty of Versailles, the town was within the borders of the reborn Poland. She received the Polish name Dziemionna, which referred to the naming of the neighboring wetland from Old Polish times. The village was still located (until 1954) in the district of Inowrocław. In 1934, as a result of administrative reform, it was included in the Złotniki Kujawskie rural commune. In the village there was a four-elementary elementary school with a German language of instruction. After the war, the murdered Poles from the villages of Dziemionna, Jakubowo, Januszkowo, Krążkowo, Prądocin and Tarkowo were buried after the exhumation at the cemetery in Lisewo Kościelny, where in 1965 a monument was erected for them. In the years 1945–1954, Dziemionna was a village cluster, part of the Złotniki Kujawskie commune. In 1948, it had an area of 186 ha and population of 278 people. In 1947, in discussions about the new administrative division, the representatives of the villages were in favor of leaving them within the territorial boundaries of the Złotniki Kujawskie commune, which was motivated by economic ties and property-related treatment of residents by the municipal authorities. The Commune National Council in Złotniki Kujawskie, however, passed a resolution to depart Dziemionna for the newly created municipality Nowa Wieś Wielka, as well as several other villages. After the administrative reform of September 25, 1954, the village was included as one of 16 village councils in the Novaya Wielka community. In 1946, there was a one-grade public school in the village with a service flat for the teacher. Until 1961, it was a full school, implementing a program of seven classes, after which the institution was liquidated, and children from the village were sent to the school circuit in Nowa Wieś Wielka. On February 13, 1974, by virtue of the resolution of the Commune National Council, Dziemionna was temporarily liquidated and the Nowa Wieś Wielka village was incorporated into the village. The previous state was restored on December 9, 1987, reactivating Dziemionna. In the years 1958-1961 the village was electrified. In 1964, as part of a social act, the road to Nowa Wieś Wielka was hardened, and in 1966 street lighting was introduced. In 1978, the construction of the water supply system was started, and a year later the road Dziemionna - Nowa Wieś Wielka was covered with asphalt. In 1993, a municipal sewage treatment plant in Dziemionno was commissioned, and in 2001-2002 the village was sewered.

References

Dziemionna